James Carson Yun (born May 13, 1981) is an American professional wrestler and actor of Korean and German descent. He is also best known for his appearances with World Championship Wrestling and the World Wrestling Federation/World Wrestling Entertainment in the late 1990s and 2000s under the ring names Jimmy Yang, Akio and Jimmy Wang Yang.

Yun was trained in the Power Plant, the World Championship Wrestling farm territory. He worked in WCW until its closure in 2001. During the following years, he worked for several promotions. In United States, he worked with NWA Total Nonstop Action (where he was part of the promotion's first match) or Ring of Honor, but most notably with World Wrestling Entertainment, where he had three different stints from 2001 to 2002, 2003 to 2005 and 2006 to 2010. During his last stint, he wrestled as Jimmy Wang Yang, an Asian-American cowboy and redneck.

He also starred in All Japan Pro Wrestling, where he won the World's Strongest Junior Tag League in 2002 with Kaz Hayashi and the Junior League in 2010.

Early life
Yun was born in Hollywood, California, the son of a German mother and a Korean father. His father was in the U.S. Army, stationed in Germany, where he met Yun's mother. He grew up in Austell, Georgia, and has three sisters and one brother.

Professional wrestling career

World Championship Wrestling (1999–2001)

In June 1999, Yun signed with World Championship Wrestling, making his WCW television debut in January 2000 under the ring name "Jimmy Yang". He was originally a part of the Jung Dragons faction along with Jamie-San and Kaz Hayashi. They were brought into WCW by Jimmy Hart to feud with 3 Count, another faction. They made their pay-per-view debut at New Blood Rising, losing a ladder match to 3 Count. They added a manager, Leia Meow, and continued the feud with 3 Count, until, in late 2000, Jamie-San unmasked and left the group, becoming known as Jamie Knoble and forming a tag team with former 3 Count member Evan Karagias. The team of Hayashi and Yang feuded with Knoble and Karagias until the WWF purchased WCW.

World Wrestling Federation (2001–2002)
In March 2001, the World Wrestling Federation acquired Yun's contract and assigned him to the company's Heartland Wrestling Association developmental territory, but he was released in December 2001.

All Japan Pro Wrestling (2002)
In 2002, Yun joined All Japan Pro Wrestling where he wrestled as both a part of its tag team division and its singles junior heavyweight division. On April 13, 2002, Yun, competing as Yang, teamed up with Kaz Hayashi and Hi69 to defeat Kazushi Miyamoto, Gran Naniwa, and Ryuji Hijikata. On July 17 on an AJPW pay-per-view, Yang teamed up with Hayashi and George Hines to defeat Ryuji Hijikata, Gran Naniwa, and Johnny Smith. Over a month later, Yang returned to AJPW on August 31, teaming with Masaaki Mochizuki and Dragon Kid to defeat Magnum Tokyo, Susumu Yokosuka, and Darkness Dragon. Yang suffered his first loss in AJPW on September 15, when he and Kazushi Miyamoto lost to Kendo Kashin and Robbie Brookside, although that same month he teamed with Kaz Hayashi to win the Real World Junior Heavyweight Tag Team League. The following month, Yang defeated Gran Hamada and Gran Naniwa in a three-way match, before he and Yoji Anjoh lost to Mike Barton and Jim Steele. Throughout the end of 2002, Yang continued competing in six-man tag team matches, with mixed results.

NWA Total Nonstop Action (2002–2003)
From May to August 2002, Yang was one third of the Flying Elvises in NWA Total Nonstop Action (NWA TNA) alongside Sonny Siaki and Jorge Estrada. Yang and the other Elvises were involved in TNA's first match, defeating A.J. Styles, Jerry Lynn, and Low Ki in a six-man tag team match. Yang continued wrestling for TNA as a singles competitor through to January 2003.

Independent circuit (2002–2003)
On December 20, 2002 Yang made his Major League Wrestling debut at King of Kings, where he and Mike Sanders lost to "Dr. Death" Steve Williams and PJ Friedman. He competed regularly in MLW throughout 2003, both in singles and tag team competition. At the War Games and J Cup USA show on September 19, 2003, Yang competed in the Super J Cup USA tournament, defeating Juventud Guerrera in the first round, but losing to Christopher Daniels in the second.

Return to WWE (2003–2005)
In September 2003, following a match with Tommy Dreamer on Sunday Night Heat, Yun was signed to a three-year developmental deal with the renamed World Wrestling Entertainment (WWE). Yun made his WWE debut on October 19, 2003 at No Mercy, along with the Japanese American Ryan Sakoda. Yun was renamed Akio (a reference to Japanese wrestler Akio Sato) and aligned himself with Sakoda, forming the villainous tag team Kyo Dai, the henchmen of the native Japanese wrestler Tajiri. Sakoda was eventually released from WWE and Tajiri was traded to Raw. This left Yun on his own to become a lower card wrestler and Velocity mainstay, competing primarily in the cruiserweight division until he was released on July 5, 2005.

Ring of Honor (2005–2006)
After being released from WWE, Yun wrestled in Ring of Honor (ROH). He debuted on October 1, 2005, at the New Yorker Hotel in Manhattan, losing to James Gibson. He lost once again the following night to Christopher Daniels and again two weeks later to Roderick Strong, causing him to kayfabe take some time away from the company.

He returned to ROH in January 2006 where he recorded his first win in ROH, teaming with Matt Sydal and Jack Evans in the Trios Tournament. The team, however, was ultimately defeated by The Embassy. Yun stayed with the company for several months, wrestling as Jimmy Yang and using the same martial arts based persona he adopted in WCW. His entrance music was the theme from the cult martial arts film The Last Dragon, and he even brought in the film's star Taimak (referred to in his appearances as 'Bruce Leroy', the name of his character) to help him in a feud with Embassy member Jimmy Rave.

Second return to WWE

Cruiserweight division (2006–2007) 
In May 2006, Yun made a return to WWE, as Akio, on an edition of Heat, working as an enhancement talent in a try-out match with Charlie Haas. This match impressed WWE, and they re-signed him once more. Beginning with the August 25, 2006 edition of SmackDown!, vignettes began airing featuring Yun dressed as a cowboy and calling himself Jimmy Wang Yang, in the process cutting his previously long hair short and growing a Fu Manchu moustache to fit the gimmick. In the vignettes, Yang questioned why people would assume stereotypical Asian things about him while proclaiming that he was much more of a redneck, of which he was proud. The vignettes played for several weeks, with Yang focusing more on his redneck leanings. On the September 29 SmackDown!, he made his in-ring debut in a loss to Sylvan, who illegally used the ropes for leverage to get a pin.

In December 2006, Yang became the number one contender for the Cruiserweight Championship. Yang challenged Gregory Helms for the Cruiserweight title, but lost to him at Armageddon. Later, he participated in a Cruiserweight Open at No Way Out for the Cruiserweight Title, but was unable to win the title. In mid-2007, Yang and Chavo Guerrero began a feud. On the June 15 edition of SmackDown!, Yang once again became the number one contender for the Cruiserweight Championship, after feuding with Guerrero for almost two months. At Vengeance: Night of Champions, Yang lost to Guerrero after a frog splash. During The Great American Bash, Yang competed in another Cruiserweight Open and although he was never pinned, Hornswoggle won the title after becoming an official entrant in the match due to him hiding under the ring. On the July 27 edition of SmackDown!, Yang teamed with Torrie Wilson against Kenny Dykstra and Victoria; Yang and Wilson won the match after Yang pinned Dykstra. Following this match, Wilson began appearing as Yang's new valet.

Teaming with Shannon Moore (2007–2008) 
On the October 12 episode of SmackDown!, Jamie Noble, in order to weed out the competition for the vacant Cruiserweight Championship, told Deuce 'n Domino that Yang had been making "lewd remarks" about Domino's on-screen sister and manager, Cherry. Deuce demanded a match against Yang from acting General Manager Vickie Guerrero. Yang won the match with his signature moonsault from the top rope, but was attacked by Deuce, Domino, and Cherry after the match. The next week, Yang and Shannon Moore teamed up against Deuce 'n Domino in a tag team match, which Yang and Moore won. On the December 18 episode of ECW, Yang and Moore defeated the WWE Tag Team Champions John Morrison and the Miz to earn a title-shot, igniting a feud between the two teams. On the January 1, 2008 episode of ECW, Yang and Moore once again beat Morrison and the Miz, this time in a six-person tag team match also involving Layla and Kelly Kelly. The following week, in a Fifteen Minutes of Fame Match, Moore and Yang tied the champions on pinfalls, resulting in Miz and Morrison retaining the titles.

Various storylines (2008–2010) 
On June 9, 2008, Yun was suspended for thirty days for his first violation of the WWE Wellness Policy. He made his return on the July 18 edition of SmackDown, being defeated by the repackaged The Brian Kendrick. In September 2009, Yun sustained cuts and bruises to his back from Kane after being attacked with a Singapore cane on an episode of WWE Superstars.

In late 2009, Yang formed a tag team with Slam Master J and in their first match as a team, they lost to The Hart Dynasty on the December 10 episode of Superstars. On the December 18 episode of SmackDown, Yang and J lost a rematch to the Dynasty. On the January 14, 2010 episode of Superstars, Yang and J scored their first win as a team after they defeated Mike Knox and Charlie Haas. On April 22, 2010, Yun was released from his WWE contract.

Independent circuit (2010–2013, 2016, 2018, 2021—present)
In May 2010, after being released by WWE, Yun returned to the independent circuit as Jimmy Yang and was announced to be part of the new HighSpots Pro Wrestling Superstars talent booking roster.

On July 25, 2010, Yun, as Jimmy Yang, returned to All Japan Pro Wrestling to take part in the 2010 Junior League. Yang finished second in his block, after victories over Shuji Kondo, MAZADA and Taka Michinoku, and advanced to the semifinals of the tournament. On August 8 Yang first defeated Minoru in the semifinals and then KAI in the finals to win the 2010 Junior Heavyweight League. With his victory Yang had earned a shot at the World Junior Heavyweight Championship, but was defeated in his title match on August 29 by the defending champion, Yang's former tag team partner, Kaz Hayashi.

Return to TNA (2011)
On June 27, 2011, Yang made a one night return to TNA at the tapings of the June 30 edition of Impact Wrestling, working in his old Flying Elvis gimmick and losing to Low Ki in a three–way first round match of a tournament for a TNA contract, which also included Matt Bentley.

Third return to WWE (2021)
Yun returned to the WWE as a backstage producer on October 25, 2021 during the live Raw broadcast. On December 28, Yun announced that WWE released him from his producer role.

Personal life
Yun has a brother named Johnathan, who is a professional breakdancer. He also has a daughter named Jazmine. He owns a professional wrestling school called Pro Training, LLC. located in Cincinnati, Ohio. In late October 2010, Yun started a pest control business called "Jimmy's Pest Control" in the Cincinnati area. Yang currently has 'redneck party bus' and 'princess party bus' businesses.

Other media
Yun appears in the 2009 film Royal Kill as a police officer.

Yun made his video game debut in WWE SmackDown vs. Raw 2009.

Championships and accomplishments
All Japan Pro Wrestling
Junior League (2010)
Bape Sta!! Tag Tournament (2003) – with Satoshi Kojima
World's Strongest Junior Tag League (2002) – with Kaz Hayashi
Pro Wrestling Illustrated
Ranked No. 110 of the top 500 wrestlers in the PWI 500 in 2007

References

External links

 
 

1981 births
American male professional wrestlers
American people of Korean descent
Faux Japanese professional wrestlers
Living people
People from Austell, Georgia
People from Cincinnati
Professional wrestlers from Georgia (U.S. state)
Professional wrestlers from California
American professional wrestlers of Asian descent
21st-century professional wrestlers
20th-century professional wrestlers